The women's 3000 metres steeplechase at the 2019 Asian Athletics Championships was held on 23 April.

Results

References

3000
Steeplechase at the Asian Athletics Championships
2019 in women's athletics